The Hengzhi chip (联想"恒智"安全芯片) is a microcontroller that can store secured information, designed by the People's Republic of China government and manufactured in China. Its functionalities should be similar to those offered by a Trusted Platform Module but, unlike the TPM, it does not follow Trusted Computing Group specifications. Lenovo is selling PCs installed with Hengzhi security chips. The chip could be a development of the IBM ESS (Embedded security subsystem) chip, which was a public key smart card placed directly on the motherboard's system management bus. As of September 2006, no public specifications about the chip are available.

See also
Trusted Computing
Trusted Platform Module

References

External links 
Lenovo releases China's first security chip 
Does China Own Your Box?

Cryptographic hardware
Trusted computing
Science and technology in the People's Republic of China